This is the complete list of (physical and digital) number-one singles sold in Finland in 2012 according to the Official Finnish Charts. The list on the left side of the box (Suomen virallinen singlelista, "the Official Finnish Singles Chart") represents physical and digital track sales as well as music streaming (from week 14 onwards) and the one on the right side (Suomen virallinen latauslista, "the Official Finnish Download Chart") represents sales of digital tracks.

Chart history

The top-ten list of the best-selling 2012 singles in Finland was the following:

See also
List of number-one albums of 2012 (Finland)

References

Number-one singles
Finland Singles
2012